Mohammed Abdul-Hamid al-Awwad (Arabic:محمد عبد الحميد العواد) was a Syrian brigadier general who was assassinated in Damascus during the Syrian Civil War. The official Syrian government news agency disclosed that he was killed by armed men, who also wounded his driver in the attack.

Assassination 
General al-Awwad's car was ambushed when he was heading to the unit he commanded in the eastern Al-Ghouta area of Damascus. The driver testified that a taxi had passed their car, while four gunmen shot al-Awwad in the head. He was from the Damascus Countryside.

References

1958 births
People from Rif Dimashq Governorate
Syrian military personnel killed in action
Deaths by firearm in Syria
2012 deaths
Terrorism deaths in Syria
Military personnel killed in the Syrian civil war
Assassinated Syrian people
Assassinated military personnel